Xuchang University is a university in Xuchang, Henan, China.

History
The Xuchang Teachers’ Learning House was established in 1907, and it became the Xuchang Teachers’ School in 1911 and the Henan Provincial Xuchang Teachers’ School during the Republican China era. Its name changed to Xuchang Teachers’ School in 1958, and its name became the Secondary Teachers’ School at a later period. The name again changed to Xuchang Teachers’ College in 1978, and in 2002 it gained its current name after receiving approval to become a provincial university.

References

External links
 Xuchang University
 Xuchang University 

Universities and colleges in Henan